Chuqipata (Aymara chuqi gold, pata step, "gold step", Hispanicized spelling Choquepata) is a mountain in the Andes of southern Peru, about  high. It is situated on the border of the Moquegua Region, General Sánchez Cerro Province, Ichuña District, and the Puno Region, Puno Province, in the districts Pichacani and San Antonio. It lies northwest of the mountain Churi Wiqu, northeast of Millu and southeast of Tankani.

References

Mountains of Moquegua Region
Mountains of Puno Region
Mountains of Peru